Lunn Poly was, at one time, the largest chain of travel agents in the United Kingdom.

History
The company originated from two successful travel agencies established in the 1890s, the Polytechnic Touring Association and Sir Henry Lunn Travel. Both firms were acquired in the 1950s by the British Eagle airline group, and combined into Lunn Poly in 1965.

It became a nationalised industry as part of the Transport Holding Company (THC). In June 1971, Sunair bought Lunn Poly from the THC for £175,000. In 1972, the company became part of Thomson Travel Group.

Lunn Poly became an early trade innovator, by splitting its leisure and business travel. High street shops concentrated on package holidays, specialized offices were structured to serve the needs of business and industry. This business model was highly successful throughout the 1970s and 1980s. By the mid-1990s it was the largest travel agency in the UK.

When TUI UK, which had acquired Thomson Travel, rebranded Britannia Airways as Thomsonfly in November 2003, the company insisted that there were no plans to rebrand Lunn Poly. On 2 November 2004, however, the announcement was made that all 800 Lunn Poly shops in the United Kingdom were to be rebranded as Thomson.

Lunn Poly was famous for a long-running advertising campaign on television. These adverts featured people looking into what holidays the company offered. Another person would then say to them in disbelief "Lunn Poly? Get away!", at which point the person would disappear into thin air and end up at a holiday spot.

References

Travel and holiday companies of the United Kingdom
Tourism in the United Kingdom